State College of Florida Collegiate School (SCFCS) is a public charter school in Florida, United States. Established in 2010, it is part of and operates on State College of Florida's Bradenton and Venice campuses. It was created through a charter with the School District of Manatee County.

Derived from the Kunskapsskolan of Sweden, the school includes grades 6–12, with the Venice campus only having senior high school grades. The Bradenton campus is outside the city limits, in the Bayshore Gardens census-designated place. The Venice campus is in an unincorporated area.

History 

The Bradenton campus opened in 2010. It initially was to admit students in grades six or seven only but with additional grade levels placed as time passed. The first high school class, consisting of 57 students, graduated in 2014.

It was named a National Blue Ribbon School in 2016, and the State of Florida gave the school "A" rankings each year by 2016.

The Venice campus is scheduled to open in 2019; the Sarasota County School Board gave its approval to the creation the year before. The Venice campus, opening with grade 11 students, is to have an initial enrollment of 100 and eventually expand to all senior high school grade levels.

Curriculum and academic program 
The school is largely technology based, utilizing Canvas, from Instructure to assign and turn in schoolwork. Each student is assigned an iPad based on their grade level, and Apple laptops are available for services not available on the iPad.
 Students start classes on the college campus in the 11th grade upon successful completion of the PERT, as well as having at least a 3.0 GPA. After completing the program, they are given an Associate degree at graduation, alongside their high school diploma.

Students may graduate with an associate degree along with a standard high school diploma.

Scholarship programs 
Graduates of the university may attend Florida Gulf Coast University and, since 2016, University of South Florida Sarasota-Manatee, without paying tuition, as part of the Eagle Collegiate Scholarship. Students at both campuses are eligible.

References

Further reading 
 STATE COLLEGE OF FLORIDA, MANATEE-SARASOTA SCF COLLEGIATE SCHOOL-VENICE CHARTER SCHOOL APPLICATION for the SARASOTA COUNTY SCHOOL DISTRICT

External links 
 

Bradenton, Florida
Venice, Florida
Schools in Manatee County, Florida
High schools in Manatee County, Florida
High schools in Sarasota County, Florida
Public middle schools in Florida
Public high schools in Florida
Educational institutions established in 2010
2010 establishments in Florida